The Old Bell is a pub at 95 Fleet Street, London EC4.

It is a Grade II listed building, dating back to the 17th century.

It is claimed that it was built by Christopher Wren for the use of his masons.

References

External links
 
 

Grade II listed pubs in the City of London